Proportionality, proportion or proportional may refer to:

Mathematics
 Proportionality (mathematics), the property of two variables being in a multiplicative relation to a constant
 Ratio, of one quantity to another, especially of a part compared to a whole
 Fraction (mathematics)
 Aspect ratio or proportions
 Proportional division, a kind of fair division
 Percentage, a number or ratio expressed as a fraction of 100

Science and art
 Proportional fonts
 Proportionally fair, a scheduling algorithm
 Proportional control, a type of linear feedback control system

Other uses
 Proportionality (law), a legal principle
 Proportion (architecture), describes the relationships between elements of a design
 Body proportions, in art, the study of relation of human body parts to each other and the whole

See also
 Proportional representation, in electoral systems